Beyond Rangoon is a 1995 drama film directed by John Boorman about Laura Bowman (played by Patricia Arquette), an American tourist who vacations in the country of Burma (now known as Myanmar) in 1988, the year in which the 8888 Uprising takes place. The film was mostly filmed in Malaysia, and, though a work of fiction,  was inspired by real people and real events.

Bowman joins, albeit initially unintentionally, political rallies with university students protesting for democracy, and travels with the student leader U Aung Ko throughout Burma. There, they see the brutality of the military dictatorship of the Ne Win Regime and attempt to escape to Thailand.

The film was an official selection at the 1995 Cannes Film Festival.

The film may have had an impact beyond movie screens, however. Only weeks into its European run, the Burmese military junta freed Nobel Peace Prize winner Aung San Suu Kyi (depicted in the film) after several years under strict house arrest. The celebrated democracy leader thanked the filmmakers in her first interview with the BBC.  Suu Kyi was re-arrested a few years later, but Beyond Rangoon had already helped raise world attention on a previously "invisible" tragedy: the massacres of 1988 and the cruelty of her country's military rulers.

Plot
Andy Bowman persuades her sister Laura to go on a trip to Burma after Laura's husband and son were murdered during a home invasion and Laura had gone into a deep depression. One night, unable to sleep because of nightmares, Laura leaves her hotel in Rangoon and gets caught up in an anti-government protest. She is very impressed by the bravery of Aung San Suu Kyi.

When her tour group leaves the country, Laura cannot leave with them as her passport was stolen the previous night. While staying behind waiting for her new passport,  she meets U Aung Ko, who acts as an unofficial tour guide and drives an ancient Chevy. He takes Laura out into the countryside to a Buddhist monastery. The car develops problems, but fortunately they are able to coast to the house of some of Ko's friends and former students. Laura learns that Ko used to be a college professor, who was banned from teaching because of his support for the anti-government activities led by his former student Min Han. She has a breakdown and tells Ko what happened to her family.

The next morning, they learn that the 8888 Uprising began the previous day. Ko takes Laura to a station to get a train back to Rangoon. She sneaks on board, but the soldiers start beating Ko, and when Min Han intervenes, Han is shot and killed. Laura gets Ko  into the car and they leave, pursued by the soldiers, but Ko is shot and wounded. They end up crashing into the Irrawaddy River, but manage to get away from the soldiers. They get on a raft taking bamboo to Rangoon. Laura, who is a doctor, operates on Ko to remove the bullet.

The next day, the raft stops at a village. Laura goes to find drugs to treat Ko. She reluctantly accepts a pistol from one of the crew. At a clinic, Laura finds the drugs she needs, but has to shoot a soldier to keep from being raped. When they arrive in Rangoon, the city is in the throes of a full-scale revolt. When Laura attempts to get into the US embassy, the military tries to arrest her for helping Ko, but the student demonstrators rescue them. After they witness soldiers killing civilians, they get put on a truck heading for the border. Near the border, the group has to abandon their truck and make a run through the jungle. There they meet up with a group of Karen rebels. Laura has a dream where her son Danny tells her she has to let him go. Ko urges Laura to do so, telling her, "All things pass, Laura. They are shadows as we are shadows. Briefly walking the earth, and soon gone."

The next day, Laura and her group of refugees make a harrowing river crossing into Thailand under mortar fire and reach a refugee camp. Having found a new purpose in life, Laura begins helping at the camp's hospital.

Cast

Reception
Critical reaction was mixed. Time, Rolling Stone, and Entertainment Weekly wrote negative reviews, while the critic for The New Yorker called the film a "fearless masterpiece" and Andrew Sarris declared himself "awestruck" by the film. Roger Ebert awarded the film three stars out of four, praising Arquette's performance and acknowledging the political repression in Burma. Distributed by Columbia Pictures, the film was not a theatrical success in America, which John Boorman partially attributed to interference by the Burmese government as well as Malaysia which was where the film was shot on location. The film was a financial success only in France (where it opened number one and gained 442,793 visitors), though it was screened in many European countries. Film critic Tullio Kezich compared the film to Rossellini's classic, Paisà, regretting that it was marred by certain directorial touches.

Beyond Rangoon holds a 37% rating on Rotten Tomatoes based on 35 reviews, with an average rating of 5.0/10. Audiences polled by CinemaScore gave the film an average grade of "B" on an A+ to F scale.

Soundtrack

Beyond Rangoon is an original soundtrack music album that was mostly composed by Hans Zimmer. The album was released in 1999 to mixed reviews.

References

External links
 
 
 

1995 films
1990s political drama films
American political drama films 
Aung San Suu Kyi
Castle Rock Entertainment films
Columbia Pictures films
Drama films based on actual events
1990s English-language films
Films scored by Hans Zimmer
Films about vacationing
Films directed by John Boorman
Films set in 1988
Films set in Myanmar
Films shot in Malaysia
Films shot in Thailand
Political films based on actual events
1995 drama films
1990s American films